Transcription factor BTF3 is a protein that in humans is encoded by the BTF3 gene.

Function 

This gene encodes the basic transcription factor 3. This protein forms a stable complex with RNA polymerase IIB and is required for transcriptional initiation. Alternative splicing results in multiple transcript variants encoding different isoforms. This gene has multiple pseudogenes.

Interactions 

BTF3 has been shown to interact with CSNK2B.

References

External links
 
 PDBe-KB provides an overview of all the structure information available in the PDB for Human Transcription factor BTF3

Further reading